Paddy Croke played in the 1961 All Ireland Hurling Final on the Dublin team against Tipperary. Paddy is originally from Tipperary.

Personal life
Paddy was married to Margaret Croke.

Death
Paddy died from a heart attack in August 1992.

Year of birth missing
1992 deaths
Dublin inter-county hurlers
Tipperary hurlers